Luis María Aguilar Morales (born 4 November 1949) is a Mexican jurist who has been a member of the  Supreme Court of Justice of the Nation since December 2009. He was President of the court between January 2015 and December 2018.

Born in Mexico City, Aguilar Morales studied law at the National Autonomous University of Mexico.

Supreme Court Nomination
In 2009 President Felipe Calderón  nominated him as a Minister (Associate Justice) of the Supreme Court to fill the vacancy left after the retirement of Mariano Azuela Guitron.   Aguilar was confirmed by the Senate with 91 votes on December 1, 2009.

References

Living people
1949 births
20th-century Mexican lawyers
National Autonomous University of Mexico alumni
People from Mexico City
Supreme Court of Justice of the Nation justices
Presidents of the Supreme Court of Justice of the Nation
21st-century Mexican judges